The following companies are either headquartered or have significant bases in Sheffield, South Yorkshire, England.

Sheffield-based
For former companies, see navigation box at the bottom of page.

A.L. Simpkin & Co. Ltd - confectionery producer
Ancon Building Products - specialist stainless steel brickwork supports
Arnold Laver - UK HQ - timber importer and merchants
Arthur Price & Co. - cutlery manufacturers
ARUP - engineering consultancy
B. Braun - UK HQ, medical appliances and surgical instruments manufacturer
Border and Immigration Agency - an executive agency of the Home Office
Company of Cutlers in Hallamshire
DavyMarkham Ltd - HQ - construction engineering
Department for Work and Pensions - civil service
Digital Solutions Global Ltd - IT and Project Management services delivery 
Fluent, Inc. European HQ - computer simulation of fluid dynamics (CFD)
Forgemasters - HQ for Sheffield Forgemasters International Ltd.
Gripple - producers of fencing materials
Henry Boot PLC - FTSE-listed construction company
Insight Enterprises - computer hardware suppliers
Irwin Mitchell - HQ of top 50 law firm
John Wilson - manufacturer of ice skating blades 
Kelham island brewery - micro brewery
Land Instruments International - manufacturer of industrial infrared temperature measurement devices and gas analysers
Littlefish - managed IT services
NAVCA - National Association for Voluntary and Community Action, the national body for Third Sector local infrastructure organisations in England
OCLC (UK) Ltd. - library automation systems
Outokumpu (Avesta Polarit) - UK HQ, stainless steel distributor
Parexel - clinical trials contracts, statistical analysis
Planet X Bikes - professional bike retailer and manufacturer
Richlyn Systems - software and website developers
SDL International - translation software
SIG plc - HQ,  European supplier of insulation, roofing and commercial interiors
Spear & Jackson International Ltd -HQ - hand tool manufacturers
Sumo Digital - games (formerly Infogrames and Gremlin)
Swann Morton - manufacturer of surgical scalpels
The Boeing Company - aerospace manufacturer
Twinkl - online educational publishing house
Ufi Ltd - EGovernment Online training organisation
WANdisco - software producers
Warp Records - independent record label, who also set up:
Bleep.com - an online record-store
Warp Films - their film division
William Stones Ltd - now defunct brewers

Major presence in Sheffield

 ARM Holdings
 Autodesk - CAD software 
 Aviva (formerly Norwich Union - call centre)
 BT Group - call centre and local network administration; Plusnet subsidiary HQ
 Cap Gemini - data (Rotherham)
 Capita - public sector outsourcing
 DLA Piper Rudnick Gray Cary - international law firm (branch office)
 DXC Technology - IT consulting
 George Wimpey - area office, national house builder
 HSBC - bank's national IT centre, and underground data centre at Tankersley
 IBM - IT consulting
McLaren Automotive - British automotive manufacturer (Corporate Office and Composites Technology Centre located on Seldon Way, Catcliffe, Sheffield S60 5XA)
 Mondelēz International - liquorice allsorts, Jelly Babies, wine gums etc factory
 Nabarro LLP - law firm
 Nationwide Building Society - building society call centre
 NXP Semiconductors - chip design
 Primetals Technologies - mining technology
 Tata Steel Europe - steel maker (bought Corus Group)
 Tesco - regional distribution centre (Clowne)
 Virgin Media - formerly Telewest Broadband, flagship call centre

See also
Economy of Sheffield

References

Economy of Sheffield
Economy of South Yorkshire
Sheffield
Companies in Sheffield